Budy Zaklasztorne  is a village in the administrative district of Gmina Puszcza Mariańska, within Żyrardów County, Masovian Voivodeship, in east-central Poland.

The village has a population of 440.

References

Budy Zaklasztorne